"Listen to Her Heart" is a song recorded by American rock band Tom Petty and the Heartbreakers. It was released in August 1978 as the second single from their second album, You're Gonna Get It!.  It peaked at number 59 on the Billboard Hot 100 singles chart in October 1978.  This song as well as "I Need to Know" was already being played live as early as June 14, 1977 as is evidenced in Germany's music television show, Rockpalast.

Background and content
Petty wrote the song as a response to Ike Turner making advances toward Petty's wife at the time.

ABC Records pushed for the mention cocaine in the opening lyrics to be changed to the more radio-friendly lyric "champagne", but Petty refused. As a result, the song received limited airplay.

Reception
"Listen to Her Heart" is considered one of Petty's greatest songs. It was ranked number five on Billboards list of Petty's 20 greatest songs and on Rolling Stones list of Petty's 50 greatest songs. Cash Box said it has "an emphatic guitar opening" and "the story of an independent woman." Record World said the song "sounds a bit like Buddy Holly and has all the elements of a pop natural."

All appearances
You're Gonna Get It!
Greatest Hits
Playback
Anthology: Through the Years
Mojo Tour 2010: Expanded Edition (Live Version)
The song was featured as playable track in the 2010 music game Guitar Hero: Warriors of Rock.
An American Treasure (2018)

Charts

References

1978 singles
Tom Petty songs
Songs written by Tom Petty
Song recordings produced by Denny Cordell
1978 songs
Shelter Records singles